Benjamin Hector (born 5 August 1979 in Durban) is a former South African first-class cricketer for the Cape Cobras. Making his debut in 2001–02 for Free State, Hector was a right-handed batsman with a highest score of 200 not out. Both his father and uncle played first-class cricket in South Africa.  His sister is field hockey player Kate Woods.

References

External links

1979 births
Living people
Cricketers from Durban
Boland cricketers
Cape Cobras cricketers
Knights cricketers
Free State cricketers
Griqualand West cricketers
South African cricketers